Western education may refer to:
 European studies
 Tongwen Guan